Migration Brewing is a brewery based in the U.S. state of Oregon.

Locations
The original pub opened on Glisan Street in northeast Portland. The company opened a location in north Portland in 2021.

Migration's taproom known as Rooftop at Canvas started as a pop-up in 2020 and opened permanently in 2021. The taproom is housed on the ninth floor on the Canvas building in the Press Blocks mixed-use development.

Migration has a production facility in Gresham.

References

External links

 

Beer brewing companies based in Oregon
Restaurants in Portland, Oregon